CYCB may refer to:

 CYCB the ICAO code for Cambridge Bay Airport.
 CycB, a cyclin protein.